Parbat Gurung is a Nepali politician and former Minister of Communication and Information Technology. Gurung’s portfolio got changed to the communication ministry from the Women, Children and Senior Citizens Ministry during a cabinet reshuffle on October 14 2020. He was elected to the House of Representatives from Dolakha constituency in the 2017 general elections He was also elected in the 2013 Nepali Constituent Assembly election from Dolakha district.

References

1968 births
Living people
Nepal Communist Party (NCP) politicians
People from Dolakha District
Government ministers of Nepal
Nepal MPs 2017–2022
Gurung people
Members of the 2nd Nepalese Constituent Assembly
Communist Party of Nepal (Unified Marxist–Leninist) politicians